David Andres Matamoros Batson (born 17 July 1956) is a Honduran lawyer and politician. He currently is Magistrate and President of the Supreme Electoral Tribunal of Honduras.

He was also deputy of the National Congress of Honduras representing the National Party of Honduras for Francisco Morazán during the 1994–98 and 2006–10 periods, also was General Secretary of the National Party (2002-2004) and President of the National Telecommunications Commission (2004-2005).

In 2009, he was appointed a magistrate of the Supreme Electoral Tribunal and served as its president during the 2010-11 period and again during the 2013-14 period.

References

1956 births
Living people
People from Washington, D.C.
20th-century Honduran lawyers
Deputies of the National Congress of Honduras
National Party of Honduras politicians
Honduran judges